Monopis dorsistrigella, the skunkback monopi, is a species of clothes moth in the family Tineidae.

The MONA or Hodges number for Monopis dorsistrigella is 0416.

References

Further reading

External links

 

Tineinae
Moths described in 1859